Oscar Erickson may refer to:

 Oscar E. Erickson (1884–1945), North Dakota politician
 Oscar Erickson (American football), American football coach